Erwan is a masculine Breton given name, sometimes spelled Erwann. Its francization is the French given name Yves.

Etymology 
From Old Breton given name . It might thus be formed of Proto-Brythonic words  "well, good" and  "talent, natural gift, ability" (compare Welsh  and Irish ), or derived from Gaulish name .

Sometimes allegedly supposed to come from the Breton word  "dragon" because of homophony in Modern Breton.

Variants 

 Masculine : Erwann, Erwane, Eroan, Ervoan, Ervan, Earwinn, Érwann, Érwan, Even or Ewen, Ewan or Evan, Iwan, Eozen, Cheun, Youen, Youenn, If, Ivi or Yvi, Von, Yeun, Yoen, Youn, Yvelin, Hélori, Hélaurie, Herwan, Herwann, Aerwan
 Feminine : Erwana, Erwanez, Youna, Youena, Vonig.

Notable people 
Notable people with the name include:

Erwan Bergot (1930–1993), French Army officer and writer
Erwan Berthou (1861–1933), French poet, writer and bard
Erwan Bouroullec (born 1976), French designer. See Ronan & Erwan Bouroullec
Erwan Pain (born 1986), French ice hockey player
Erwan Quintin (born 1984), French footballer
Erwan Vallerie (born 1944), French economist and Breton nationalist
Erwan Dianteill (born 1967), French anthropologist and sociologist, professor at Paris-Sorbonne University

References

Breton masculine given names
French masculine given names